Zadorikha is a rural locality (a village) in Boretskoye Rural Settlement of Vinogradovsky District, Arkhangelsk Oblast, Russia. The population was 22 as of 2010.

Geography 
Zadorikha is located on the Severnaya Dvina River, 84 km southeast of Bereznik (the district's administrative centre) by road. Skobeli is the nearest rural locality.

References 

Rural localities in Vinogradovsky District